Basal plate may refer to:

 Basal plate (neural tube), the region of the neural tube ventral to the sulcus limitans
 Basal plate (placenta), between this plate and the uterine muscular fibres are the stratum spongiosum and the boundary layer
 The base of a plant's bulb
 The pedal disc, in anatomy of the sea anemone, the surface opposite to the mouth
 The region if electron density at which the central microtubule pair are nucleated in the eukaryotic flagellum axoneme

See also 
 Plate (anatomy), for other uses of the word "plate" in an anatomical context
 Plate (disambiguation)
 Basal (disambiguation)